The Commission for Countering Extremism is a British government agency created under Prime Minister Theresa May in response to the 2017 Manchester Arena bombing.

History
The idea was mentioned in the 2017 election platform of the Conservative Party, released four days before the Manchester bombing attack. May described the Commission as "a statutory body to help fight hatred and extremism in the same way as we have fought racism."

Sara Khan was named head of the new commission in January 2018. The appointment was criticised by former Conservative Party chairwoman Sayeeda Warsi, Harun Khan, the secretary general of the Muslim Council of Britain, and Labour MP Naz Shah.

On 24 February 2021 the Commission released a report "Operating with Impunity - Hateful extremism: The need for a legal framework".

References

External links

Operating with Impunity - Hateful extremism: The need for a legal framework 24 February 2021 report of the Commission

Organizations established in 2017
Counterterrorism in the United Kingdom
United Kingdom commissions and inquiries
Counter extremism